Tooting Bec Athletics Track & Gym is an athletics stadium in Tooting Common, near Tooting Bec, Wandsworth, southwest London, England.
 It is located on Tooting Bec Road. An annual race event on the track in September is the Self Transcendence 24 Hour Track Race London.

References

External links
 Tooting Bec Athletics Track

Buildings and structures in the London Borough of Wandsworth
Athletics venues in London
Tourist attractions in the London Borough of Wandsworth
Sport in the London Borough of Wandsworth